Kiran Sonia Sawar is a Scottish actress best known for her role in the one-off drama Murdered by My Father.
In 2017, Sawar appeared in "Crocodile", an episode of the fourth season of anthology series Black Mirror.

Early life
Sawar is of Pakistani descent and grew up in Pollokshields, Glasgow. She attended the University of St Andrews where she received a degree in Marine and Environmental Biology. After graduating, she trained in acting at the Oxford School of Drama, where she left in 2012.

Career
Sawar made her acting debut in theatre before landing her first television role in 2015. After a series of minor roles in various television series, she garnered critical acclaim for her role as the protagonist in the BBC television drama Murdered by My Father, which highlighted the issue of honour killings. She portrayed Cordelia in the 2016 stage adaptation of Evelyn Waugh's novel Brideshead Revisited.

Filmography

Film

Television

References

External links 
 

Living people
21st-century British actresses
Actresses from Glasgow
Alumni of the University of St Andrews
British actresses of South Asian descent
Scottish people of Pakistani descent
Scottish television actresses
Year of birth missing (living people)
Pollokshields